The 2000–01 Cincinnati Bearcats men's basketball team represented University of Cincinnati as a member of Conference USA during the 2000–01 NCAA Division I men's basketball season. The head coach was Bob Huggins, serving in his 12th year at the school. The Bearcats finished with a 25–10 record (11–5 C-USA).

Roster

Schedule and results

|-
!colspan=12 style=|Regular Season 

|-
!colspan=12 style=|Conference USA Tournament 

|-
!colspan=12 style=|NCAA Tournament

Rankings

^Coaches did not release a Week 1 poll.
*AP did not release post-NCAA Tournament rankings

2001 NBA draft

References

Cincinnati Bearcats men's basketball seasons
Cincinnati
Cincinnati
Cincin
Cincin